The Martin XLB-4 was a 1920s proposal for a light bomber by the Glenn L. Martin Company.

Design and development
The XLB-4 would have been a biplane bomber of all metal construction, powered by two Pratt & Whitney R-1690 Hornet radial engines. The United States Army Air Corps (USAAC) ordered a single prototype serialled 27-332, but the aircraft was cancelled because the USAAC leadership was lukewarm about experimenting with all-metal aircraft.

Specifications (XLB-4 estimated)

See also

References

Huff-Daland XlB-04
XLB-04
Biplanes
Twin piston-engined tractor aircraft